Trophon nucelliformis is a species of sea snail, a marine gastropod mollusk in the family Muricidae, the murex snails or rock snails.

Description
The shell can grow to be 22 mm in length.

Distribution
Can be found off of South Shetland Islands and the South Orkney Islands.

References

Gastropods described in 1984
Trophon